North Rothbury is a small town located in the Hunter Region of New South Wales, Australia. It is 19 km from Cessnock.  In the 2016 Australian Census the suburb was home to 898 people. Rothbury is another small settlement roughly 5km to the southwest.

The town has a memorial to the 1929 Rothbury Riot.

The town is home to a small population of the critically endangered North Rothbury Persoonia (Persoonia pauciflora).

References

Towns in New South Wales
Suburbs of Singleton Council
Suburbs of City of Cessnock